A Büchner flask, also known as a vacuum flask, filter flask, suction flask, side-arm flask, Kitasato flask or Bunsen flask, is a thick-walled Erlenmeyer flask with a short glass tube and hose barb protruding about an inch from its neck. The short tube and hose barb effectively act as an adapter over which the end of a thick-walled flexible hose (tubing) can be fitted to form a connection to the flask. The other end of the hose can be connected to source of vacuum such as an aspirator, vacuum pump, or house vacuum. Preferably this is done through a trap (see below), which is designed to prevent the sucking back of water from the aspirator into the Büchner flask.  The purpose of applying a vacuum is to speed the filtration by providing a pressure differential across the filter medium that is greater than that produced by gravity alone.

The thick wall of the Büchner flask provides it the strength to withstand the pressure difference while holding a vacuum inside.  It is primarily used together with a Büchner funnel fitted through a drilled rubber bung or an elastomer adapter (a Büchner ring) at the neck on top of the flask for the filtration of samples. The Büchner funnel holds the sample isolated from the suction by a layer of filter paper. During filtration, the filtrate enters and is held by the flask while the residue remains on the filter paper in the funnel.

The Büchner flask can also be used as a vacuum trap in a vacuum line to ensure that no fluids are carried over from the aspirator or vacuum pump (or other vacuum source) to the evacuated apparatus or vice versa.

It is commonly thought to be named after the Nobel Laureate Eduard Buchner, but it is actually named after the industrial chemist Ernst Büchner. It is also known as a Kitasato flask in honor of Kitasato Shibasaburō.

Notes

References

 

Laboratory glassware
Air-free techniques